Fam El Hisn is a town in Tata Province, Souss-Massa, Morocco. According to the 2004 census it had a population of 7,089.

External links

References

Populated places in Tata Province